Erwin Angerer (born  30 December 1964, in Mühldorf) is an Austrian politician who has been a Member of the National Council for the Freedom Party of Austria (FPÖ) since 2014.

References

1964 births
Living people
Members of the National Council (Austria)
Freedom Party of Austria politicians
21st-century Austrian politicians